Neel Dutt (born 7 March 1979) is an Indian composer and singer from Kolkata. He received the National Film Award for Best Music Direction from the Govt. of India in 2012 for the soundtrack of the Bengali film Ranjana Ami Ar Ashbona (Ranjana I ain't coming back no more). Dutt is the third person from West Bengal to win the Best Music Direction award. He is arguably the first music director in India to rearrange a Rabindranath Tagore composition with modern electronic music.

Early life 
Neel Dutt was born on 7 March 1979 in Kolkata. His parents are Anjan Dutt and Chanda Dutt. Anjan, an actor and filmmaker, is also a prolific musician from the 1990s scene of modern Bengali music. Chanda is a retired English teacher at St. Augustine's Day School, Kolkata.

As an infant, Dutt's first school was Mr. Pires Private School. Later, he moved to middle school at Seventh Day Adventist School, Kolkata. Following his high school education at St. Augustine's Day School, he studied English literature at Asutosh College, Kolkata. He completed his master's degree in English literature from the University of Calcutta in 2002.

Early career 
Dutt was still in middle school when his father started writing songs in Bengali in 1993. That was when he first began to accompany him on the guitar. The two went on to become the first father-son musician duo in modern Bengali music. Playing the guitar professionally with his father from the age of 13 was his first experience in live music as well as studio sessions. From the end of 1993, the duo started performing live and they toured extensively. He received his first Gold Disc from HMV for their first album, Shuntey Ki chao, which released in 1995.

Film music 
While studying for his post graduation, Dutt composed for his first feature film, titled Bow Barracks Forever, a film made in English. He scored and composed the whole soundtrack including the songs. A four-year long delay in the film's release made it the second released feature film with Dutt as the music director. It was showcased in various film festivals all over the world and has been a recipient of awards and accolades.

The feature film that became his first musical release is The Bong Connection, a bilingual film made in English and in Bengali. The soundtrack was the highest selling album in 2007. The film was screened at the Museum of Modern Arts in New York in 2007.

Musical origins and influences 
Dutt grew up listening to a lot of sixties and seventies British and American musicians, whose influence seeped into every aspect of his musical performance. He started playing the guitar from the age of twelve when he was still in junior school. It began with picking up a few chords from his seniors in school and gradually developed into quite a love affair with the instrument. He began to take private lessons from one of the most prominent guitar players in the country, Amyt Datta, whom Rolling Stone magazine (India) announced to be one of the country's true live guitar gods. The guitar then became an inseparable part of his life.

In 2007 Dutt joined his friend and vocalist Arko Mukherjee, a fellow guitar player Rajkumar Sengupta and drummer Deboprotim Baksi to form Friends of Fusion (FOF), a contemporary fusion project. They started experimenting with Hindustani classical and folk traditions. The band released its self-titled debut album in 2009 from Saregama India which was considered to be a failure amongst the fans. FOF toured for three years and released its second album, titled 4/, in 2012. The band split shortly after this and Dutt moved on with his career in films.

When Byomkesh Bakshi released in 2010, it brought Dutt's abilities and his fondness for background scoring to the forefront. Dutt received the Etv Sangeet Puroshkar for the Best Background Score in 2013 for the film Dutta Vs Dutta. With the success of subsequent Byomkesh Bakshi films, Abar Byomkesh (2012), Byomkesh Phire Elo (2014) and the new revamped Byomkesh Bakshi (2015) starring Jisshu Sengupta, the Byomkesh theme has become quite synonymous to the legendary truth seeker's appearance on the big screen as well as on television.

Dutt's subsequent scoring for Anjan Dutt's Shesh Boley Kichu Nei (2013) and Srijit Mukherjee's Nirbaak (2015) received accolades from critics. In 2014, Neel composing for filmmaker Aparna Sen's experimental Hindi film Saari Raat. There on he composed for Sen's next two films Sonata(2017) and Gharey O Baire (2019).
In 2016, Neel rejoined Srijit Mukherjee for his film Uma.
Currently he on going projects are Anjan Dutt's Saheber Cutlet. This is a musical in the authentic way. For the first time in an Indian film the entire cast sang the songs themselves after rigorous training sessions with Neel. No playback singers have been used.

Filmography

Music composer 

Bow Barracks Forever (2004)
Ek Mutho Chabi (2005)
The Bong Connection (2006)
Chalo Let's Go (2008)
Brake Fail (2009)
Chowrasta Crossroads of Love (2009)
Madly Bangalee (2009)
Cross Connection (2010)
Byomkesh Bakshi (2010)
Rong Melanti (2011)
Jaani Dyakha Hawbe (2011)
Ranjana Ami Ar Ashbona (2011)
Abar Byomkesh (2012)
Dutta Vs Dutta (2012)
Maach Mishti & More (2013)
Ammi R Aamar Girlfriends (2013)
Ganesh Talkies (2013)
Biye Notout
Shesh Boley Kichu Nei (2013)
Khola Hawa (2014)
Byomkesh Phirey Elo (2014)
Nirbaak (2015)
Cross Connection 2 (2015)
Byomkesh Bakshi (2015)
Hemanta (2016)
Byomkesh O Chiriyakhana (2016)
Saari Raat (2016)
Sonata (2017)
Byomkesh O Agnibaan (2017)
Aami Ashbo Phirey (2018)
Uma (2018)
Ahare Mon (2018)
Shonar Pahar (2018)
Finally Bhalobasha (2019)
Ghawre Bairey Aaj(2019)
Tiki-Taka (2020)

Lyricist 
The Bong Connection (2005)

References

External links 

1979 births
Living people
Bengali musicians
Indian film score composers
Musicians from Kolkata
Asutosh College alumni
University of Calcutta alumni
Best Music Direction National Film Award winners
Bengali film score composers
21st-century Indian composers